Davis & Elkins College (D&E) is a private college in Elkins, West Virginia.

History
The school was founded in 1904 and is affiliated with the Presbyterian Church.  It was named for Henry G. Davis and his son-in-law Stephen B. Elkins, who were both members of the United States Senate from West Virginia.

The Senator, the college newspaper, was founded in December 1922.

Athletics

The school's athletic teams, known as the Senators, compete in NCAA Division II, primarily in the Mountain East Conference (MEC). The Senators had been members of the West Virginia Intercollegiate Athletic Conference (WVIAC) from the league's founding in 1924 until its demise in 2013, after which the school joined the Great Midwest Athletic Conference (G-MAC). In 2019, the Senators joined the MEC, thereby reuniting with most of their historic rivals.

Men's sports include baseball, basketball, cross country, golf, lacrosse, soccer, swimming, tennis, and indoor & outdoor track. All of these sports compete in the MEC except for lacrosse, which remains in the G-MAC because the MEC sponsors that sport only for women. Women's sports include triathlon, acrobatics & tumbling, basketball, cross country, lacrosse, soccer, softball, swimming, tennis, indoor & outdoor track, and volleyball. Acrobatics & tumbling and triathlon, neither of which the MEC sponsors, compete as independents (without a conference affiliation).

Enrollment
The college enrolls 805 students, with a 12:1 student/faculty ratio.

Campus buildings
1890–1924
Halliehurst Mansion
Graceland Mansion
The Icehouse
Gatehouse

1925–1976
Liberal Arts Hall
Charles E. Albert Hall
Boiler House Theatre
Memorial Gymnasium/Martin Field House (dedicated October 2010)
Jennings Randolph Hall
Benedum Hall
Eshleman Science Center
Walter S. Robbins and Elisabeth Shonk Robbins Memorial Chapel
Hermanson Center
Graceland Inn & Robert C. Byrd Center for Hospitality & Tourism
Darby Hall
Roxanna Booth Hall
Gribble Hall
Presidential Center 
International Hall/Moyer Hall (dedicated October 2010)

1992–Present
Booth Library
Charles B. Gates Jr. Memorial Tower
Madden Student Center & William S. Robbins Centennial Tower
The McDonnell Center for Health, Physical Education and Athletics
Myles Center for the Arts (dedicated October 2012)

Affiliated programs
Augusta Heritage Center, at Davis & Elkins College, provides instruction and performances, folklife programs, and a home for significant collections of field recordings, oral histories, photographs, instruments, and Appalachian art. "We teach. We share. We celebrate the wonder and diversity of the heritage arts."

Augusta Heritage Center is best known for intensive week-long workshops that attract several hundred participants annually. Thousands more attend its public concerts, dances, and festivals. Augusta's full-time staff, plus volunteers, seasonal staff, and work-study students, produce a variety of workshops. These world-renowned workshops and festivals have brought together master artists, musicians, dancers, craftspeople, and enthusiasts of all ages.

The Center for Railway Tourism at Davis & Elkins College provides an 18-credit undergraduate minor in Railway Heritage Tourism Management.  The curriculum includes course work, independent study opportunities, an internship, and an opportunity to study abroad, all focused on preparing students for a career in restoring and presenting all aspects of America's railroad heritage.
 
The Center for Railway Tourism also provides information and resources for the railway heritage community nationwide to help it assess and meet the interests and needs of a fast-changing national population made up of growing numbers of millennials, racial and ethnic minorities, immigrants, and women.  Other programs address literacy, STEAM education principles, evolving heritage strategies, and techniques for increasing the general public's awareness of the many ways railroads have influenced American life and culture.

Notable alumni
 Red Corzine, professional football player
 Glenn Davis, sportscaster
 Jan Eriksson, professional soccer player
 Tex Irvin, professional football player
 Kaia Kater, musician
 Press Maravich, college basketball coach and father of "Pistol" Pete Maravich
 Terry Rooney, college baseball coach (did not graduate)
 Tobi Stoner, professional baseball player
 Cheryl Abplanalp Thompson, Team USA handball player in 1996 Summer Olympics, inductee into Davis and Elkins College Hall of Fame

References

External links
 Official website
 Official athletics website

 
Davis and Elkins family
Buildings and structures in Elkins, West Virginia
Education in Randolph County, West Virginia
Educational institutions established in 1904
Presbyterianism in West Virginia
Private universities and colleges in West Virginia
1904 establishments in West Virginia
Universities and colleges affiliated with the Presbyterian Church (USA)